The 1973 European Tour was a series of golf tournaments that comprised the Professional Golfers' Association (PGA) tournament circuit. It is officially recognised as the second season of the PGA European Tour.

Historically, the PGA's Order of Merit only included tournaments in Great Britain and Ireland, but in 1970 events in continental Europe were included for the first time. The circuit and organisation evolved further over the following years, adopting the name PGA European Golf Tour in 1979.

The season was made up of 21 tournaments counting for the Order of Merit, and some non-counting tournaments that later became known as "Approved Special Events". The schedule included the major national opens around Europe, with other tournaments mostly held in England, Scotland and Wales.

The Order of Merit was won by England's Peter Oosterhuis.

Changes for 1973
There were three changes from the previous season, with the addition of the Portuguese Open and the Scandinavian Enterprise Open, and the loss of the John Player Trophy.

Schedule
The following table lists official events during the 1973 season.

Unofficial events
The following events were sanctioned by the European Tour, but did not carry official money, nor were wins official.

Order of Merit
The Order of Merit was based on prize money won during the season, calculated using a points-based system.

Awards

See also
List of golfers with most European Tour wins

Notes

References

External links
1973 season results on the PGA European Tour website
1973 Order of Merit on the PGA European Tour website

European Tour seasons
European Tour